Jalan Pasir Gogok (Johor state route J221) is a major road in Johor, Malaysia.

List of junctions

References

Roads in Johor